Elizabeth Street Garden (ESG) is a  community sculpture garden in the Nolita neighborhood of Manhattan, New York City, located on Elizabeth Street between Prince and Spring Streets.  The garden is managed by Elizabeth Street Garden, Inc. (ESG), a 501(c)(3) non-profit organization, and open to the public for general use and community events by ESG volunteers.

City-owned and privately leased, the Garden is open to the public daily, weather permitting. Neighborhood volunteers operate the Garden year-round and program more than 200 free, public educational, wellness and arts-related events annually for children, seniors and all who live and work in the community.

History
The original site of P.S. 106, later renamed P.S. 21 designed by master school architect C.B.J. Snyder in 1903 with public outdoor space that functioned as a neighborhood social and civic center. The school stood at least through the mid-to-late 1970s. In 1981, the Little Italy Restoration Apartments were built on Spring St., including much of the former school site. Plans to build a new school never panned out due to community opposition and the school’s playground became a vacant 20,000-sq-ft lot with frontage on Elizabeth and Mott streets, between Prince and Spring streets that eventually became the garden.

In 1990, Manhattan Community Board 2 Parks Committee passed a resolution in favor of leasing it to Allan Revier, owner of Elizabeth Street Gallery located in a renovated 1850s New York City firehouse adjacent to the garden property on Elizabeth Street, on a month-to-month basis. In 1991, the garden was developed and created by Reiver who planted an array of perennial flowers, native plants, and trees with a display of architectural remnants, gates, fencing, statuary, tables, and seating from his gallery collection.

In 2013 the garden became the subject of a public debate surrounding the development of public housing or to establish a more community-centered public green space. Community members worked with Reiver to revitalize the space and open the front gates to the public, introducing public programming and developing a significant base of support for retaining the green space for community use. In August 2014 this group formed into Friends of Elizabeth Street Garden, Inc. (FESG). In April 2017, members of FESG and the original community group branched off to form Elizabeth Street Garden (ESG) which now manages the garden, keeping the space open to the public seven days a week and providing free public and educational programming for the community.

In June 2019, the City Council voted unanimously to redevelop the garden into affordable senior housing. The new development is projected to have 123 non-permanent affordable apartments for seniors, programming for its residents, luxury ground-floor retail, 11,200 square feet of office space for the developer partner, Habitat NYC, and approximately 6,600 square feet of privately-owned open space. Councilmember Margaret Chin and Manhattan Borough President Gale Brewer both supported the redevelopment despite opposition from community members, the local community board, state Senators and Assembly members. Chin disputed the popular narrative that the garden was a longstanding public space, saying "It was never open to the public until they heard that the site was going to be designated for affordable housing."

In March 2019, Elizabeth Street Garden (ESG) filed a lawsuit to stop the proposed development. ESG is currently represented by Norman Siegel.

Gallery

See also
Community Gardens in New York City
Community gardening in the United States

References

External links

History of Community-Gardens at NYCGovParks.org

Nolita
Parks in Manhattan
1991 establishments in New York City
Sculpture gardens, trails and parks in New York (state)